The 99th Infantry Regiment (French - 99e régiment d'infanterie or 99e RI) was an infantry regiment of the French Army. It was formed in 1791 by renaming the Royal Deux-Ponts Regiment and fought in the French Revolutionary Wars before being merged into another unit in 1803. A new and unrelated 99th Infantry Regiment was formed in 1855 and took on the traditions of the previous regiment.

History
On 1 January 1791 the National Constituent Assembly decided to remove the Royal Deux-Ponts Regiment's royal affiliation and rename it the 99th Line Infantry Regiment. On 21 July that year it lost its original status as a foreign-raised regiment and was fully integrated into the French army. It helped pursue the fleeing Prussians at Valmy and at Jemmapes in 1792 and in the battles of Blaton, Neerwinden and Kaiserslautern in 1793.

In 1793 it also became the 99th Battle Demi-Brigade, formed of the 1st Battalion of the 50th Line Infantry Regiment and the 4th and 9th Volunteer Battalions of Les Bouches-due-Rhône. It fought at the battle of Fleurus (1794) before being transferred to the armée d'Italie, in which it fought at Ponte-di-Nova on 16 April, Sotta on 26 May and Rochetta on 21 September. It then fought at Loano on 22 November 1795 and at Voltri, Millesimo, Dego, Montenotte, Fombio and Borghetto during the 1796 Italian campaign.

Its composition was also changed in 1796 - from then on it was made up of the 127th Battle Demi-Brigade (1st Battalion of the 68th Line Infantry Regiment, 2nd Eure Volunteer Battalion and 5th Haute-Marne Volunteer Battalion) and 172nd Battle Demi-Brigade (2nd Battalion of the 94th Line Infantry Regiment, 4th Marne Volunteer Battalion and 6th Marne Volunteer Battalion). It continued serving in 1796, taking part in the fighting at Limburg an der Lahn, Altenkirchen, Neubof and Mainz.

It was sent back to Italy in 1798, fighting in 1799 at the Trebbia, Bassignana, Novi, Fossano and Mondovi and in 1800 in the Var campaign and the crossing of the Mincio. In 1803 the unit was amalgamated with the 62nd Line Infantry Regiment.

Commanders

Colonels
 1781 : marquis de Custine ;
 1786 : Maximilien Constantin de Wurmser (*) ;
 1791 : Louis-Amable de Prez ;
 1792 : Jean-Christophe Wisch (**; wounded 2 March 1792) ;
 1793 : Jean François Leval (**) ;

Chefs de brigade
 1793 : Élie Lafont (*) ;
 1796 : Pierre Joseph Petit ;
 1798 : Georges Mouton ;

 (*) Officers who later became brigadier generals  (**) Officers who later became divisional generals.

References

Bibliography (in French) 
 ''Colonel (h) André Mudler Président de l’Amicale des anciens des 99e et 299e RI.

External links (in French) 
 Historique du 99e régiment d'infanterie.
 Amicale Royal deux-ponts / 99e et 299e RI.

1791 establishments in France
1803 disestablishments in France
Infantry regiments of France
Military units and formations established in 1791
Military units and formations disestablished in 1803
Regiments of the First French Empire
Regiments of the French First Republic